PCFC may refer to:

 Polokwane City F.C.
Pontefract Collieries F.C.
Prescot Cables F.C.
Protonic ceramic fuel cell